WEDI may refer to:

 WEDI (AM), an AM radio station located in Eaton, Ohio
 Workgroup for Electronic Data Interchange (WEDI)

See also
Wedi 7
WEDY
WIDI (disambiguation)